Sidewinder may refer to:

Snakes
 Sidewinding, a form of locomotion used by some snakes
 Bitis peringueyi or sidewinding adder, a venomous adder species found in Namibia and southern Angola
 Cerastes cerastes or Saharan horned viper, a venomous pit viper found in northern Africa and parts of the Middle East
 Crotalus cerastes or  sidewinder rattlesnake, a venomous pit viper species found in the southwestern United States

Amusement park rides 
 Sidewinder (roller coaster element), an inversion involving a half-loop followed by a half-corkscrew
 Sidewinder (Elitch Gardens), a roller coaster in Denver, Colorado
 Sidewinder (Hersheypark), a roller coaster in Hershey, Pennsylvania
 Sidewinder, a ride at Sandcastle Waterworld in Blackpool, England

Computing 
 Microsoft SideWinder, a family of digital game controllers
 Sidewinder, firewall software from Secure Computing (now McAfee)

Fiction 
 Sidewinder (character), a Marvel supervillain
 Budd (Kill Bill) or Sidewinder, a character in the Kill Bill films
 Sidewinder, a machine in the Thunderbirds TV series
 The nickname of Patience Barton in the 1969 film Support Your Local Gunfighter

Music 
 Sidewinder (band), a band from Australia
 Sidewinders, a barbershop quartet
 The Sidewinders, an Arizona rock band
 Sidewinder (EP), a 1996 EP by Download
 The Sidewinder, a 1964 album by Lee Morgan
 "The Sidewinder" (composition), a composition by Lee Morgan
 Sidewinder a 2017 EP by Stand Atlantic
 Sidewinder, an electronic music composition and album by Morton Subotnick
 "Sidewinder", a song by Avenged Sevenfold from City of Evil
 "Sidewinder", a song by Catfish and the Bottlemen from The Balcony
 "Sidewinder", a song by The Cynic Project
 "Sidewinder", a song by Lard from Pure Chewing Satisfaction
 "Sidewinder", a song by Photek from Form & Function Vol. 2
 "Sidewinder", a song by Stand Atlantic from Sidewinder EP

Sports 
 Sidewinders (X-League), an American football team in Japan
 Tucson Sidewinders, a AAA baseball team
 Sidewinder, a freestyle skateboarding trick
 Sidewinder, a baseball pitcher who throws using a side-arm delivery

Vehicles
 Bell Sidewinder, a clone of the Phantom X1 aircraft
 Dodge Sidewinder, a 1997 concept car
 Kia Sidewinder, a 2006 concept car
 Smyth Sidewinder, a two-seat experimental aircraft developed in 1969

Video games 
 Sidewinder (Mastertronic video game), a 1988 video game for the Amiga
 Sidewinder (video game) or Mission Cobra, a 1989 action arcade game for NES

Other uses 
 AIM-9 Sidewinder, an air-to-air missile
 A mini-revolver manufactured by North American Arms
 Sidewinder (slot car), a type of model car with a transverse motor
 Operation Sidewinder (disambiguation)

See also
 "The Sidewinder Sleeps Tonite", a song by R.E.M.

Animal common name disambiguation pages